Warren David Hunt (born 2 March 1984) is an English former professional footballer who played as a striker .

Hunt was born in Portsmouth. He was originally signed with Portsmouth, but never made an appearance. Warren played for Leyton Orient in the Football League.

External links

1984 births
Living people
Footballers from Portsmouth
English footballers
Association football forwards
Portsmouth F.C. players
Leyton Orient F.C. players
Fareham Town F.C. players
Chichester City F.C. players
Sholing F.C. players
English Football League players